Attila Simon may refer to:

 Attila Simon (footballer, born 1979), Hungarian footballer for Békéscsaba 1912 Előre SE
 Attila Simon (footballer, born 1983), Hungarian footballer for Dorogi FC
 Attila Simon (footballer, born 1988), Hungarian footballer for Répcelaki SE
 Attila Simon (runner) (born 1939), Hungarian Olympic athlete
 Attila Simon (sport shooter) (born 1970), Hungarian sport shooter